Enrique José Mühn (born 1897 in San Jerónimo Department) was an Argentine clergyman and bishop for the Roman Catholic Diocese of Jujuy. He was ordained in 1930. He was appointed bishop in 1934. He died in 1966.

References 

1897 births
1966 deaths
Argentine Roman Catholic bishops
Roman Catholic bishops of Jujuy